ERG Mobile was an Italy-based Mobile virtual network operator.

The company was founded in February 2009 and launched on 15 April 2009 by the Italian oil company Edoardo Raffinerie Garrone (ERG). They based on Vodafone Italy GSM/GPRS/EDGE/UMTS network. The company closed on 30 March 2019.

References

External links
 Official site 

Companies based in Rome
Mobile phone companies of Italy
Mobile virtual network operators